Collect Pond, or Fresh Water Pond, was a body of fresh water in what is now Chinatown in Lower Manhattan, New York City. For the first two centuries of European settlement in Manhattan, it was the main New York City water supply system for the growing city. The location of the former pond later became the site of a jail, and is now memorialized by Collect Pond Park, which includes a reflecting pool to acknowledge the historic importance of this body of water.

Pond description
Fed by an underground spring, it was located in a valley, with Bayard Mount (at  the tallest hill in lower Manhattan) to the northeast and Kalck Hoek (Dutch for Chalk Point, named for the numerous oyster shell middens left by the indigenous Native American inhabitants) to the west. A stream flowed north out of the pond and then west through a salt marsh (which, after being drained, became a meadow by the name of "Lispenard Meadows") to the Hudson River, while another stream issued from the southeastern part of the pond in an easterly direction to the East River.

The southwestern shore of Collect Pond was the site of a Native American settlement known as Werpoes. A small band of Munsee, the northernmost division of the Lenape, occupied the site. In 1542 the French established a fortified trading post on an island in the pond known as Fort d'Anormée Berge (Fort of the Grand Scarp). It is unclear when it was disestablished. The Munsee continued to live at Collect Pond until the Dutch settlement of New Amsterdam was established in the 17th century. It is possible that members of this band were the participants in the sale of Manhattan to the Dutch.

Collect Pond was used as a terms of boundary for night watch duties in 1731 under John Montgomerie's charter during the British rule in New York City. The pond was home to a copious amount of fish, and in 1734 legislation was passed preventing the use of nets in the pond. This was prior to the extreme pollution to the pond, which included the dumping of dead animals.

18th century 

In the 18th century, the pond was used as a picnic area during summer and a skating rink during the winter. Beginning in the early 18th century, various commercial enterprises were built along the shores of the pond in order to use the water. These businesses included Coulthards Brewery, Nicholas Bayard's slaughterhouse on Mulberry Street (which was nicknamed "Slaughterhouse Street"), numerous tanneries on the southeastern shore, and the pottery works of German immigrants Johan Willem Crolius and Johan Remmey on Pot Bakers Hill on the south-southwestern shore. By the late 18th century, the pond was considered "a very sink and common sewer".

John Fitch's steamboat experiment

Connecticut inventor John Fitch was an instrument maker working in the later part of the 18th century. As an early pioneer of steam navigation, Fitch tested several steamboats on the Delaware River between 1785 and 1788. Fitch’s real success, however, occurred in 1796 when he tested another ship equipped with a paddle wheel on Collect Pond. On the boat with him was fellow inventor Robert Fulton, Robert R. Livingston, who was the first Chancellor of New York and a signer of the Declaration of Independence, and 16-year-old John Hutchings, steering.

This was six years before Fulton and Livingston launched “Fulton’s Folly” on the Seine River in France. Hutchings claims to have been a “lad” at the time who “assisted Mr. Fitch in steering the boat”. In a broadside issued in 1846, Hutchings asserts that it was in fact Fitch who designed the steam propulsion mechanism. He claims that both Fulton and Livingston were present during Collect Pond tests and in fact depicts both, as well as Fitch and himself, in a paddlewheel steam ship in the upper left quadrant of the broadside. Though Fulton seems to have received most of the credit for the era of steam navigation, Hutchings hoped, through the publication of this broadside, to shed some light on Fitch’s contributions as well. A plaque at Collect Pond Park, however, states that though Fitch's account "is often repeated, no evidence has been found to substantiate the story."

Contamination and landfill
The contaminated wastewater of the businesses surrounding the pond flowed back into the pond, creating a severe pollution problem and environmental health hazard. Pierre Charles L'Enfant proposed cleaning the pond and making it a centerpiece of a recreational park, around which the residential areas of the city could grow.  His proposal was rejected, and it was decided to drain and fill in the pond. This was accomplished with soil partially obtained from leveling the nearby hills of Bayard's Mount and Kalck Hoek, and by digging a canal to the north to encourage the water to drain into the river. The landfill was completed in 1811, and middle class homes were soon built on the reclaimed land.

The landfill was poorly engineered. The buried vegetation began to release methane gas (a byproduct of decomposition) and the area, still in a natural depression, lacked adequate storm sewers. As a result, the ground gradually subsided. Houses shifted on their foundations, the unpaved streets were often buried in a foot of mud and mixed with human and animal excrement, and mosquitoes bred in the stagnant pools created by the poor drainage.

Several decades later, New York City obtained a new, plentiful supply of fresh water from the Croton Aqueduct. The neighborhood known as "Five Points", a notorious slum, developed near the former eastern bank of the Collect and owed its existence in some measure to the poor landfill job (completed in 1811) which created swampy, mosquito-ridden conditions on land that had originally had more well-to-do residents.

Most middle and upper class inhabitants fled the area, leaving the neighborhood open to poor immigrants that began arriving in the early 1820s. This influx reached a height in the 1840s, with large numbers of Irish Catholics fleeing the Great Famine.

The Tombs

New York's jail, nicknamed "The Tombs", was built on Centre Street in 1838 on the site of the pond and was constructed on a huge platform of hemlock logs in an attempt to give it secure foundations. The  design, by John Haviland, was based on an engraving of an ancient Egyptian mausoleum. It initially accommodated about 300 prisoners.

The prison building began to subside almost as soon as it was completed and was notorious for leaks in its lowest tier and for its general dampness. The original building was replaced in 1902 with a new one on the same site connected by a "Bridge of Sighs" to the Criminal Courts Building on the Franklin Street side. When the original Tombs building was condemned and demolished at the end of the century, large concrete caissons were emplaced to bedrock, as much as 140 feet below street level, in order to give its replacement more secure foundations. That building was replaced in 1941 by one across the street on the east side of Centre Street with the entrance at 125 White Street, officially named the Manhattan Detention Complex, though still referred to popularly as "The Tombs".

Park conversion

In 1960, a portion of the former site of Collect Pond was given to the New York City Department of Parks and Recreation for conversion into a park. Originally, the park was named "Civil Court Park" because of its proximity to the surrounding courthouse buildings. However, the park was renamed "Collect Pond Park", its current name, to represent its history more accurately.  The park is located on the block bordered by Lafayette Street, Leonard Street, Centre Street, and White Street.

The park was closed for a total reconstruction. In 2012, reconstruction of the park uncovered the granite foundation of The Tombs, leading to a partial stop-work order pending archaeological investigation. The newly rebuilt park re-opened in May 2014 including a water feature evocative of the former Collect Pond.

It is still possible to ascertain the rough boundaries of Collect Pond and original topography in the elevations of the streets in the area, with the lowest elevation being Centre Street which runs in the approximate center of the former pond.

References

External links

Collect Pond Park on Google maps
Collect Pond Video
Collect Pond Park — New York City Department of Parks & Recreation

Five Points, Manhattan
Water infrastructure of New York City
History of New York City
Parks in Manhattan
Former lakes of the United States
Chinatown, Manhattan
Lakes of Manhattan